Polydor Records is a German-British record label that operates as part of Universal Music Group. It has a close relationship with Universal's Interscope Geffen A&M Records label, which distributes Polydor's releases in the United States. In turn, Polydor distributes Interscope releases in the United Kingdom. Polydor Records Ltd. was established in London in 1954 as a British subsidiary of German company Deutsche Grammophon/Schallplatte Grammophon GmbH. It was renamed Polydor Ltd. in 1972. The company is usually mentioned as "Polydor Ltd. (UK)",
or a similar form, for holding copyrights

Notable current and past artists signed to the label include  James Brown, Ray, Goodman & Brown, Atlanta Rhythm Section, John Mayall, Deep Purple, Cream, The Moody Blues, The Who, Jimi Hendrix, Bee Gees, The Jam, Style Council, The Shadows, James Last, Eric Clapton, Gloria Gaynor, Yngwie Malmsteen, Lana Del Rey, Mandrill, Buckingham Nicks, Level 42, and Billie Eilish.

Label history

Beginnings
Polydor Records was founded on 2 April 1913 by German Polyphon-Musikwerke AG in Leipzig and registered on 25 July 1914 (Nr. 316613). The label was founded as Firma Brachhausen & Riesener in 1887 by Gustav Adolf Brachhausen and Ernst Paul Riessner, for manufacturing their new mechanical disc-playing music box Polyphon, invented in 1870. During World War I on 24 April 1917, Polyphon-Musikwerke AG acquired the German Deutsche Grammophon-Aktiengesellschaft record plant and company from the German government. The German state had taken over British-held Grammophon as enemy property during World War I.
Polydor was originally an independent branch of the Polyphon-Grammophon-Konzern group. It was used as an export label from 1924. After the British and German branches of the Gramophone Company were separated during World War I, Deutsche Grammophon claimed the rights to the Nipper-dog and gramophone trademark for Germany, where HMV recordings were to be released under the Electrola trademark replacing the company lost during the war.  In turn, Deutsche Grammophon records exported from Germany were released on the Polyphon Musik and Polydor labels. New foreign branches were founded, for example in Austria, Denmark, Sweden and France.

In 1941, Deutsche Grammophon (including Polydor) was purchased by Siemens & Halske.

Polydor became a popular music label in 1946, while the new Deutsche Grammophon Gesellschaft label became a classical music label in 1949. The previously used label, Grammophon, was disbanded. DGG gave, by an agreement dated 5 July 1949, an exclusive license from 1 July 1951 to use the Nipper-dog with gramophone to the original owner's company Electrola, the German branch of EMI. (In Germany, it was impossible to sell the trademark without selling the company.) Polydor remained Deutsche Grammophon's export label, including classical music, in France and the Spanish-speaking world for the remainder of the long-playing era, as a result of language and cultural concerns. DGG established a subsidiary in London called Polydor Records Ltd. in 1954.

In the early 1960s, orchestra leader Bert Kaempfert signed unknowns Tony Sheridan and The Beatles, credited as The Beat Brothers, to Polydor. Popular International entertainers such as James Last, Bert Kaempfert, Kurt Edelhagen, Caterina Valente and the Kessler Twins appeared on the Polydor label, as well as many French, Spanish and Latin-American figures.

Siemens entered into a joint venture with Philips in 1962 creating the Grammophon-Philips Group, of which Polydor became a subsidiary label.

Polydor opened a US branch in 1969 (in years prior, they licensed their catalogue to Atlantic Records), but did not become a real presence in the US record industry until its purchase of the recording contract and back catalogue of R&B performer James Brown in 1971, and the absorption of the MGM Records label by its parent company PolyGram in 1972.

In 1970, Polydor acquired the Hong Kong–based Diamond Records, which had been owned and founded by the local Portuguese merchant Ren da Silva in the late 1950s.

PolyGram

In 1972, The Grammophon-Philips Group (GPG) reorganised to create PolyGram, from Polydor and PhonoGram.  The Polydor label continued to run as a subsidiary label under the new company. Throughout the 1970s, Polydor Incorporated became a major rock label, also releasing records by such platinum-selling acts as the Bee Gees and Gloria Gaynor. 

Into the 1980s, Polydor continued to do respectable business, in spite of becoming increasingly overshadowed by its PolyGram sister label Mercury Records. Polydor took over management of British Decca's pop catalogue. A&R manager Frank Neilson was able to score a major top ten hit in March 1981 for the label with "Do the Hucklebuck" by Coast to Coast as well as signing Ian Dury and Billy Fury to the company. In 1984, the company name was parodied in the rockumentary film This Is Spinal Tap (whose soundtrack album was distributed by Polydor), where "Polymer Records" was the band's record company.

By the early 1990s, Polydor had begun to underperform. PolyGram subsequently trimmed most of Polydor's staff and roster, and shifted it to operate under the umbrella of PolyGram Label Group (PLG), a newly constructed "super label" specifically designed to oversee the operations of PolyGram's lesser performing imprints, which included Island Records, London Records, Atlas Records and Verve Records at the time.

In 1994, as Island Records recovered from its sales slump, PolyGram dissolved most of PLG into it. Meanwhile, Polydor Records and Atlas Records merged, briefly called "Polydor/Atlas", and began operating through A&M Records, another PolyGram subsidiary. In 1995, Polydor/Atlas became simply Polydor Records again.

Twilight years in the United States 
Over the next few years, Polydor tried to keep itself afloat with new artist signings, new releases, and reissues, while still becoming more and more dormant. In 1998, PolyGram was purchased by Seagram and absorbed into its Universal Music Group. During the consolidation of these two music giants, Polydor's United States operations were folded into Interscope-Geffen-A&M and Universal Records, while its overseas branch remained intact, with its records continuing to be distributed domestically through Interscope and A&M. Today, in North America, the Polydor Records name and logo is mostly used on reissues of older material from its 1960s and 1970s heyday. Island Records handles the US distribution of most pre-1998 Polydor releases, including the reissues from the British Decca pop/rock collections, while Republic Records handles reissues from James Brown and the MGM Records and Verve Records pop catalog. However, starting in the 2010s, Interscope Records has been signing acts such as Azealia Banks and Lana Del Rey jointly to Polydor and its logo has been seen on both releases.

Polydor Nashville
Record producer Harold Shedd founded Polydor's Nashville, Tennessee, division in 1994, which specialised in country music. Among the acts signed to Polydor Nashville were Shane Sutton, Tasha Harris, 4 Runner, the Moffatts, Chely Wright, Mark Luna, Clinton Gregory, Amie Comeaux, along with Toby Keith and Davis Daniel, who transferred from Mercury Nashville in 1994. The Nashville division was renamed A&M Nashville in March 1996 and closed in September of the same year, as PolyGram consolidated all its Nashville operations under the Mercury name. Today, Polydor, along with EMI Records in the UK and Australia and UMG itself in Canada distribute Lost Highway Records' albums in the Commonwealth realms.

Polydor UK
In 1972 the British Polydor Records Ltd. was renamed to Polydor Ltd. In the early 1970s, the main source of income for the label was the successful UK band Slade as well as The New Seekers and The Who. At the time, between the 1970s and 1980s, the Polydor/PolyGram Senior VP (who was originally the first head of their new at the time rock department) was Jerry Jaffe, who also signed acts such as Motörhead, Dexy's Midnight Runners, and The Jam. He also interacted with many famous and successful artists while in that position, including Nick Lowe and John Lennon, as well as going on to work with groups such as The Jesus and Mary Chain and Saint Etienne the late 1980s and 1990s. Later, in the late 1970s and early 1980s, the label was also home to The Who and The Jam (as well as its successor act The Style Council).

Although Polydor's American branch is nearly inactive, in the United Kingdom Polydor remains one of the most prominent labels in the country—with artists such as Take That, Cheryl, Duffy, Girls Aloud, The Saturdays, Kaiser Chiefs, Ellie Goulding and Lawson. Polydor also has a strong indie roster through the Fiction imprint with acts such as Ian Brown, Bright Eyes, Elbow, White Lies, The Maccabees, Kate Nash, Snow Patrol, Filthy Dukes, and Crystal Castles. Polydor has also survived in Canada, becoming the home label for Drake. It also acts as the UK label for American-based acts under Interscope-Geffen-A&M like Madonna, Eminem, the All-American Rejects, the Black Eyed Peas, Gwen Stefani, Dr. Dre, Lana Del Rey, Lady Gaga, Selena Gomez, Kendrick Lamar, Maroon 5, M.I.A., No Doubt, Sting and JoJo.

In 2006, Polydor launched Fascination Records, a music label dedicated to pop music. Both Girls Aloud and Sophie Ellis-Bextor transferred to the new label and created groups such as The Saturdays and Girls Can't Catch. Several pop acts from US label Hollywood Records, such as Demi Lovato, Jonas Brothers, Miley Cyrus, and Selena Gomez & the Scene were also signed to Fascination.

In 2008, A&M Records UK was founded as an imprint of Polydor UK. The same year Polydor obtained distribution of The Rolling Stones' back catalogue as well as new releases. With the establishment of A&M Records UK, A&M Records' Canadian division became a separate entity for the first time since the formation of Universal Music Group. Polydor, meanwhile, continued to distribute Interscope, Geffen and selected Lost Highway releases in Canada through Universal Music Canada, as it does to this day.

Polydor Japan 
In December 2022, Universal Music Japan reorganized Universal J, which previously was known as Universal Polydor until 2002. The label was split into two record labels, UJ and Polydor Records. The changes took place on January 1, 2023. The first release under Polydor in Japan was 's debut studio album, Hiiragai.

See also
 Polydor Records artists

References

External links
 Polydor.co.uk UK site
 Polydor.de German site
 Polydor at Discogs
 Polydor A&R team contact list

1913 establishments in Germany
British record labels
British subsidiaries of foreign companies
Contemporary R&B record labels
English record labels
German record labels
Heavy metal record labels
Hip hop record labels
Jazz record labels
Labels distributed by Universal Music Group
Pop record labels
Record labels established in 1913
Rhythm and blues record labels
Rock record labels
Soul music record labels